Pyrausta socialis, the sociable pyrausta moth,  is a moth in the family Crambidae. It was described by Augustus Radcliffe Grote in 1877. It is found in North America, where it has been recorded from Ontario west to British Columbia, south to Montana and Colorado.

The wingspan is 22–25 mm. The forewings are deep reddish or pinkish brown with a dark subterminal band. The hindwings are whitish buff with a fuscous postmedial line.

Subspecies
Pyrausta socialis socialis
Pyrausta socialis perpallidalis Munroe, 1976 (Washington, Oregon)

References

Moths described in 1877
socialis
Moths of North America